The National Museum of the Sultanate of Oman is a museum located in Oman. It was developed as a result of a ten year collaboration between the Ministry of Heritage and Culture, the Royal Estate Affairs of Oman, Jasper Jacob Associates (J.J.A.), and Arts Architecture International Ltd (A.A.I.), and opened to the public in 2016.

Background 
The museum was established by a royal decree in 2013 and opened on July 30, 2016. It was designed to be the Sultanate's flagship cultural institution, showcasing the nation’s heritage from the earliest human settlement in the Oman Peninsula some two million years ago through to the present day.

Collection 
The National Museum houses 5,466 objects, among which an internationally significant collection of prehistoric metallic artifacts. Its curator, Mouza Sulaiman Mohamed Al-Wardi, is part of an international team exploring the legacy of Oman's silver working tradition, where historically women were also silversmiths.

The museum is equipped with infrastructure for 43 digital immersive experiences, a Learning Centre, conservation facilities, an ultra-high definition cinema, and discovery areas for children. It adopted the region’s first open-plan museum storage concept, where visitors can learn about the various processes that artifacts go through before they are put on display. It features an integrated infrastructure for special needs and is the first museum in the Middle East to adopt Arabic Braille script for the visually impaired.

Building 
The museum is located in the heart of Muscat in a purpose-designed building. A further  are allocated for temporary exhibitions.

Galleries

Images

Board of Trustees 
His Excellency Salim bin Mohammed al-Mahrouqi - Minister of Heritage and Tourism, Chairman of the Board of Trustees
H.H. Sayyida Dr. Mona bint Fahad bin Mahmoud al-Said  - Assistant Vice Chancellor  for International Cooperation at Sultan Qaboos University- member
His Excellency  Sayyid Said bin Sultan al-Busaidi  - Undersecretary of the Ministry of Culture, Sports and Youth- member
Dr Abdullah bin Khamis Ambusaidi - Education Under-Secretary at the Ministry of Education - member
His Excellency Sheikh Hameed bin Ali al-Maani - Head of the Department of Global Affairs at the Ministry of Foreign Affairs - member
Dr. Mounir Bouchenaki - Director of the Arab Regional Centre for World Heritage - member
Mikhail Borisovich Piotrovskiy - Director General of the Hermitage Museum, Russia - member

References

External links

2013 establishments in Oman
Museums established in 2013
History museums in Oman
National museums of Oman
Museums in Muscat, Oman
Old Muscat